Furnace Run is a tributary of Catawissa Creek in Columbia County, Pennsylvania, in the United States. The stream is the last named tributary to enter Catawissa Creek before its mouth. The main rock formations are the Pottsville Group and the Mauch Chunk Formation. The stream itself is considered to be a high quality coldwater fishery and Class A Wild Trout Waters.

Course
Furnace Run begins on Catawissa Mountain in eastern Catawissa Township. It flows northeast in a valley and enters Main Township after approximately a thousand feet. After continuing northeast for a few tenths of a mile, it turns east-southeast. A short distance downstream, it receives an unnamed tributary and turns east-northeast and crosses a road. More than a mile further downstream, the stream reaches its confluence with Catawissa Creek.

Tributaries
Furnace Run has one unnamed tributary. It is known as "Trib 27545 to Furnace Run".

Geography, geology, and hydrology

The main rock formation in the watershed of Furnace Run is the Pocono Formation. However, the Mauch Chunk Formation is found in the watershed's lower reaches. The main soils in the watershed are the Hazleton soil and the Leck Kill soil.

The total concentration of alkalinity in the watershed of Furnace Run is 2 milligrams per liter.

Watershed
The upper reaches of the watershed are in the Pennsylvania State Game Lands Number 58. The watershed of the stream is mostly in southwestern Main Township, but a portion of it is in southeastern Catawissa Township.

History
A furnace known as the Catawissa Furnace was constructed on Furnace Run near Mainville in 1815 by John Hauck.

Furnace Run was named in the middle of the 1800s after an iron furnace that was located in its vicinity. A nineteenth-century school district or geographical district known as the Furnace District was located in Cleveland Township. It was named after Furnace Run.

Biology
The Pennsylvania Department of Environmental Protection classifies Furnace Run as a high-quality coldwater fishery. The stream is considered by the Pennsylvania Fish and Boat Commission to be Class A Wild Trout Waters from its headwaters to its mouth.

Brook trout inhabit Furnace Run and reproduce naturally there.

See also
Scotch Run (Catawissa Creek), next tributary of Catawissa Creek going upstream
List of tributaries of Catawissa Creek

References

External links
Map of the Catawissa Creek watershed 

Rivers of Columbia County, Pennsylvania
Tributaries of Catawissa Creek
Rivers of Pennsylvania